Smart Lander for Investigating Moon (SLIM) is a lunar lander being developed by the Japan Aerospace Exploration Agency (JAXA). The lander will demonstrate precision landing technology. By 2017, the lander was planned to be launched in 2021, but this has been subsequently delayed to 2023 due to delays in SLIM's rideshare mission, X-Ray Imaging and Spectroscopy Mission (XRISM).

Overview 
SLIM will be Japan's first lunar surface mission, and will demonstrate precise, pinpoint lunar landing. During its descent to the Moon, the lander will recognize lunar craters by applying technology from facial recognition systems, and determine its current location from utilizing observation data collected by the SELENE (Kaguya) lunar orbiter mission. According to Yoshifumi Inatani, deputy director general of the JAXA Institute of Space and Astronautical Science (ISAS), by succeeding in this extremely precise landing, it will lead to enhancing the quality of space exploration.

SLIM is planned to be launched together with the X-Ray Imaging and Spectroscopy Mission (XRISM) space telescope, and is to land near the Marius Hills Hole, a lunar lava tube entrance discovered by Kaguya. The expected cost for developing this project is 18 billion yen.

Rover 
The SLIM team assessed in the past the inclusion of a small rover in this mission. A preliminary concept considered a rover with two inflatable wheels that would enter — or drop into — the lava tube while deploying miniature communication relay devices along the traverse. Other concepts suggested developing a miniature rover without wheels but able to "hop" along.

Lunar Excursion Vehicle 2 (LEV-2), a tiny rover developed by JAXA in joint cooperation with Tomy, Sony Group, and Doshisha University, will be mounted on SLIM.

History 
On 27 December 2013, ISAS called for proposals for its next "Competitively-Chosen Medium-Sized Focused Mission", and SLIM was among the seven proposals submitted. In June 2014, SLIM passed the semi-final selection along with the DESTINY+ technology demonstration mission, and in February 2015 SLIM was ultimately selected. From April 2016, SLIM gained project status within JAXA. In May 2016, Mitsubishi Electric (MELCO) was reportedly awarded the contract for building the spacecraft. SLIM is scheduled to be the second Japanese lunar lander to operate from the Moon's surface; on 27 May 2016 NASA announced that the OMOTENASHI (Outstanding Moon exploration Technologies demonstrated by Nano Semi-Hard Impactor) CubeSat lander jointly developed by JAXA and the University of Tokyo will be launched as a secondary payload on Space Launch System (SLS) Artemis 1. OMOTENASHI was meant to deploy a mini lunar lander weighing 1 kg, however on 21 November 2022, JAXA announced that attempts to communicate with the spacecraft have ceased, due to the solar cells failing to generate power because of them facing away from the Sun. They won’t face towards the Sun until March 2023.

In 2017, because of funding difficulties arising m from XARM (XRISM)'s development cost, SLIM's launch was switched from a dedicated Epsilon flight to a rideshare H-IIA flight. The resulting cost savings will be transferred to develop other satellites that are behind schedule due to XRISM.

See also 

 Hiten
 Kaguya (SELENE)
 LUPEX
 OMOTENASHI
 List of missions to the Moon

References

External links 
 Official project site 
 JAXA SLIM page
 ISAS/JAXA SLIM page

Missions to the Moon
Japanese Lunar Exploration Program
Japanese space probes
2023 in spaceflight
Proposed space probes